Atractus torquatus, the neckband ground snake, is a species of snake in the family Colubridae. The species can be found in Colombia, Bolivia, Brazil, Peru, Venezuela, French Guiana, Guyana, and Ecuador.

References 

Atractus
Reptiles of Colombia
Snakes of South America
Reptiles described in 1854
Taxa named by André Marie Constant Duméril
Taxa named by Gabriel Bibron
Taxa named by Auguste Duméril